The Aurore class was a class of fifteen coastal submarines designed for the French Navy. The prototype – Aurore – was authorised in 1934, the next four in 1937, a further four in 1938, two  in 1938, and a final four subsequently. Some of the ships were captured by Nazi Germany after the Fall of France, most of them in an unfinished state; two were intended to be completed for the German Navy, Africaine becoming UF-1 and Favorite becoming UF-2, but only the first was completed during the  World War II, the second reverting to French control while still uncompleted.

Andromède, Artémis and Créole were fitted with GUPPY sails and submarine snorkels.

Ships
 
Builder: Toulon
Ordered: 1934
Laid down: December 1935
Launched: 26 July 1939
Fate: Scuttled during the scuttling of the French fleet in Toulon on 27 November 1942

 
Builder: Le Havre
Ordered: 1937
Laid down: December 1937
Launched: 8 June 1940
Fate: Broken up in 1961

 
Builder: Le Havre
Ordered: 1937
Laid down: December 1937
Launched: -
Fate:  Broken up in June 1940 still on keel, never finished

 
Builder: Rouen
Ordered: 1937
Laid down: December 1937
Launched: September 1938
Fate: Taken by the German, becoming UF-2; scuttled in 1945 at Gotenhafen

 
Builder: Rouen
Ordered: 1937
Laid down: December 1937
Launched:7 December 1946
Fate: Broken up in 1963

 
Builder: Nantes
Ordered: 1938
Laid down: November 1938
Launched: 3 May 1946
Fate:  Broken up in 1965

 
Builder: Nantes
Ordered: 1938
Laid down: November 1938
Launched: 17 November 1949
Fate: Broken up in 1965

 
Builder: Chalon-sur-Saône
Ordered: 1938
Laid down: November 1938
Launched: -
Fate: Broken up in 1940 still on keel, never finished

 
Builder: Rouen
Ordered: 1938
Laid down: November 1938
Launched: -
Fate: Broken up in 1940 still on keel, never finished

 
Builder: Le Havre
Ordered: 1939
Laid down: May 1939
Launched: 28 June 1942
Fate: Broken up in 1967

 
Builder: Rouen
Ordered: 1938
Laid down: May 1939
Launched: -
Fate: Broken up in 1940 still on keel, never finished

 
Builder: Le Havre
Ordered: 1939
Launched:
Fate:  Broken up on keel while only 8% built

 
Builder: Le Havre
Ordered:
Launched:
Fate: Broken up on keel while only 5% built

 
Builder: Nantes
Ordered:
Launched:
Fate: Broken up in 1940 still on keel, never finished

 
Builder:
Ordered:
Launched:
Fate: Keel never laid

See also
 List of submarines of France
 French submarines of World War II

References
 Conway : Conway's All the World's Fighting Ships 1922–1946 (1980)

External links
 Les sous marins de type "AURORE" 

Submarine classes
 
 
Ship classes of the French Navy